Joseph Mostert (26 July 1912 – 28 April 1967) was a Belgian middle-distance runner. He competed in the men's 1500 metres at the 1936 Summer Olympics.

References

1912 births
1967 deaths
Athletes (track and field) at the 1936 Summer Olympics
Belgian male middle-distance runners
Olympic athletes of Belgium
Place of birth missing